Vicente Escrivá (1 June 1913 – 18 April 1999) was a Spanish film director, producer and screenwriter. He worked on more than 50 films between 1948 and 1999.

Selected filmography

 Agustina of Aragon (1950)
 Our Lady of Fatima (1951)
 The Lioness of Castille (1951)
 Reckless (1951)
 From Madrid to Heaven (1952)
 The Song of Sister Maria (1952)
I Was a Parish Priest. (1953)
 He Died Fifteen Years Ago (1954)
 Judas' Kiss (1954)
 The Cock Crow (1955)
 The Other Life of Captain Contreras (1955)
 The Big Lie (1956)
 Miracle of the White Suit (1956)
 We Thieves Are Honourable (1956)
 Dulcinea (1963)
 Zorrita Martinez (1975)
 Love, Hate and Death (1989)

External links

1913 births
1999 deaths
Spanish film directors
Spanish film producers
Spanish male screenwriters
People from Valencia
20th-century Spanish screenwriters
20th-century Spanish male writers